Tim Riley (born 1960) is a music journalist who reviews pop and classical music for NPR, and has written for The New York Times, truthdig, the Huffington Post, the Washington Post, Slate.com and Salon.com.

Career
His first book was Tell Me Why: A Beatles Commentary (Knopf/Vintage 1988), a critique of the Beatles' music, which The New York Times said brought "new insight to the act we've known for all these years". 

His television appearances include Morning Joe, PBS NewsHour, CBS Morning and Evening News, MTV, and the History Channel.

Since 2009, he has taught digital journalism at Emerson College in Boston. Brown University sponsored Riley as its critic-in-residence in 2008.  
Riley gave a keynote address at Beatles 2000, the first international academic conference in Jyväskylä, Finland. Since then, he has given lectures on censorship in the arts and rock history. His subsequent projects include the music metaportal Riley Rock Index and a biography of John Lennon (Hyperion, 2011), which was included in Kirkus Reviews''' list of the Best Nonfiction of 2011.

BooksTell Me Why: A Beatles Commentary (1988), Hard Rain: A Dylan Commentary (1992),  Madonna Illustrated (1992), Fever: How Rock 'n' Roll Transformed Gender in America (2004),  Lennon: The Man, the Myth, the Music - The Definitive Life (2011), What Goes On: The Beatles, Their Music, and Their Time'' (Walter Everett and Tim Riley, 2019),

References

External links
 

Living people
1960 births
Writers from Boulder, Colorado
People from Concord, Massachusetts
American music critics
American music historians
American male non-fiction writers
American biographers
Oberlin College alumni
Eastman School of Music alumni
Emerson College faculty